The Canon EOS 5DS and EOS 5DS R (known as the EOS 5Ds and EOS 5Ds R in Japan) are two closely related digital SLR cameras announced by Canon on February 6, 2015. Both are professional full-frame cameras with 50.6-megapixel sensors, the highest of any full-frame camera at the time of announcement. The only difference between the two models is that the sensor of the "R" version includes an optical filter that cancels out the effects of a standard optical low-pass filter. This distinction is roughly similar to that between Nikon's now-replaced D800 and D800E (with the E having a self-cancelling filter). Canon stated that both the 5DS and 5DS R will not replace the older EOS 5D Mark III; therefore, both the 5DS and 5DS R will have their new positions in Canon's DSLR camera lineup.

At the time of announcement, estimated prices were US$3,699.00 and US$3,899.00 (EOS 5DS and EOS 5DS R), with announced date of availability, through authorized Canon retailers, in June 2015.

Despite the record-high pixel count and related storage and processing power, these cameras do not shoot 4K video or high frame rate 1080p video.

Full-size demosaicked jpeg files from this camera occupy approximately 20 megabytes and exceed 8K resolution.

Features

 50.6 effective megapixels full-frame CMOS sensor
 Dual DIGIC 6 image processors with 14-bit processing
 100% viewfinder frame coverage with 0.71× magnification
 1080p Full HD video recording at 24p, 25p (25 Hz) and 30p (29.97 Hz) with drop frame timing
 720p HD video recording at 60p (59.94 Hz) and 50p (50 Hz)
 480p ED video recording at 30p and 25p
 5.0 frames per second continuous shooting
 "Anti-flicker" feature (first introduced on the EOS 7D Mk II) – the shutter release can be set to compensate for flickering electric lighting
 ISO sensitivity 100–6400 (expandable to H: 12800)
 3.2″ Clear View II LCD screen with 1,040,000 dots resolution
 61 points autofocus system, with 41 cross-type points
 252 zones color-sensitive metering system
 EOS Scene Detection System with a new 150,000 pixels RGB + IR metering sensor
 Magnesium alloy body
 Weather sealing (resistance to water and dust)
 New shutter and mirror mechanism to help reduce vibrations and camera shake

Trivia

The apparent design difference between the 5DS and 5DS R is the colour of their name: the name 'EOS 5DS' is printed in gold on the 5DS and in silver on the 5DS R (like on all Canon EOS cameras); the letter 'R' of the 5DS R is printed in red.

References

External links

Canon EOS 5DS: Digital Photography Review Feb 6, 2015
 In Focus: EOS 5DS, 5DS R News 16th Jul. 2015

5Ds
Cameras introduced in 2015
Full-frame DSLR cameras